BNS Surma was a Ajay class Patrol Vessel of the Bangladesh Navy. She was gifted by Indian Navy in 1974.

See also
List of historic ships of the Bangladesh Navy
BNS Padma

References

Ships of the Bangladesh Navy
Patrol vessels of the Bangladesh Navy